Raecene McGregor (born 23 October 1997) is a New Zealand rugby league footballer who plays for the Sydney Roosters in the NRL Women's Premiership and the Wests Tigers in the NSWRL Women's Premiership.

Background
McGregor was born in Sydney to New Zealand parents and attended Bass Hill High School. She represented Australia in rugby sevens at the 2014 Summer Youth Olympics, winning a gold medal. She also represented New South Wales and Australia in soccer and touch rugby. She played for the Macquarie University Rays during the University Sevens competition.

Playing career
In 2016, McGregor played in the NSWRL Women's Premiership for the Greenacre Tigers. In 2017, she represented New Zealand at the 2017 Women's Rugby League World Cup.

In June 2018, McGregor joined the St George Illawarra Dragons ahead of the inaugural NRL Women's Premiership. In Round 1 of the 2018 NRL Women's season, she made her debut for the Dragons in their 4–30 loss to the Brisbane Broncos.

In 2019, she joined the Brisbane Broncos. Later that month, she was a member of New Zealand's 2019 Rugby League World Cup 9s-winning squad.

On 8 January 2020, she signed with the Wests Tigers for the 2020 NSWRL Women's Premiership season. On 22 February, McGregor represented the Māori All Stars in their 4–10 loss to the Indigenous All Stars.

On 1 November 2020, McGregor was named in the top 3 players in the world on the official NRL site.

In late September 2022, McGregor was named as the winner of the 2022 NRLW Dally M Medal. McGregor was also named in the NRL'S NRLW Team of the Year and in the Dream Team announced by the Rugby League Players Association. The team was selected by the players, who each cast one vote for each position. McGregor also took out the RLPA's highest individual honour, the Players' Champion award.

In October 2022 she was selected for the New Zealand squad at the delayed 2021 Women's Rugby League World Cup in England.

References

External links
Brisbane Broncos profile

1997 births
Living people
Australian female rugby league players
Australian female rugby sevens players
Australia international rugby sevens players
Australian people of New Zealand descent
Brisbane Broncos (NRLW) players
New Zealand women's national rugby league team players
St. George Illawarra Dragons (NRLW) players
Youth Olympic gold medalists for Australia
Rugby sevens players at the 2014 Summer Youth Olympics